The Strand Arts Centre is an independent four-screen cinema in Belfast, Northern Ireland. It is one of the two remaining independent cinemas in Belfast, alongside the Queen's Film Theatre. It is located on the Holywood Road. It has long been acclaimed for being one of the cheapest cinemas in Belfast.

Opened in 1935, the cinema's streamlined moderne design, it is said, was influenced by its proximity to the nearby shipyard of Harland & Wolff, featuring curved walls and portholed foyer. The cinema interior was sub-divided in the early 1980s. From 1984 to 1987, The Strand was re-opened as a live concert venue by local businessman, Ronnie Rutherford. In 1999, the original red brickwork of the building was rendered and painted and Art Deco flourishes added over its entrance.  The original steel windows were replaced in aluminum framed windows at that time.  Following its remodeling, the Strand won a RIBA Architecture Award. The building is landmark in east Belfast due to its prominent location at a busy junction.

The Strand originally built for an English Unions Cinema chain, and consisted of a single screen. The first film to be shown in the theatre was Bright Eyes featuring Shirley Temple.

The Strand is one of the venues for the Belfast Film Festival, during which it screens classic films. During the 2005 festival the cinema celebrated its 70th birthday by screening A Night to Remember, the 1958 film about the sinking of RMS Titanic, built by Harland & Wolff.

In 2012, The Strand once again offered live theatre as it did in the past, beginning with The Strand Star search, a talent show to find new acts for its new variety nights.

It was featured prominently in the first episode of the 2020 BBC Three comedy My Left Nut.

References

http://www.culturenorthernireland.org/features/film/ten-things-you-might-not-know-about-strand

External links
Official website

Buildings and structures in Belfast
Culture in Belfast
Cinemas in Northern Ireland
Buildings and structures completed in 1935
Streamline Moderne architecture in the United Kingdom